The Kingman Unified School District is the school district for Kingman, Arizona and nearby areas. It includes 11 schools.

Owens-Whitney Elementary School District students may choose to attend Kingman USD for high school. Additionally, since 2008 Peach Springs Unified School District of Peach Springs sends its high school students to other districts, one of them Kingman USD. Previously Peach Springs operated its own high school, Music Mountain Junior/Senior High School.

Schools
 High schools
Kingman High School
Lee Williams High School

 Middle schools
Kingman Middle
White Cliffs

 Elementary schools
Black Mountain
Cerbat
Desert Willow
Hualapai
Manzanita
Mt. Tipton (serves Dolan Springs) - Formerly K-12, but now K-6

References

External links

School districts in Mohave County, Arizona
Kingman, Arizona